The Caspian stellate tadpole-goby (Benthophilus leobergius), also known as the starry goby, is a species of gobiid fish endemic to the Caspian Sea basin. In the southern part of the basin, it is mentioned near the Ogurja Ada, in the Gorgansky Bay, and in the Sefīd-Rūd River. This species can reach a length of  SL.

The fish was named by Boris Ilyin after the ichthyologist and geographer Leo S. Berg, and properly taxonomically described by Berg himself the same year, then as a subspecies of Benthophilus stellatus (i.e. B. stellatus leobergius).
 The specific name is a latinisation of Berg's name.

References

Fish of Central Asia
Fish of Western Asia
Fish of the Caspian Sea
Fish of Russia
Benthophilus
Endemic fauna of the Caspian Sea
Fish described in 1949